The Laos National U-17 football team is the major U-17 youth team of Laos.

Coaching staff

Players
 The following 23 players were selected for 2023 AFC U-17 Asian Cup qualification, which took place in  Kyrgyzstan.

Results and fixtures 
The following is a list of match results in the last 12 months, as well as any future matches that have been scheduled.

2022

2022

2023

Performances

AFC U-16 Championship

1985 to 1994 – Did not enter
1996 to 2002 – Did not qualify
2004 – Group stage
2006 – Disqualified
2008 to 2010 – Did not qualify
2012 – Group stage
2014 to 2016 – Did not qualify
2018 – Did not qualify
2023 – Qualified

AFF U-16 Championship

Laos has organized the tournament twice, in 2011 and in 2012.

2002: second
2005: third
2006: fourth
2007: second
2008: did not participate
2010: did not participate
2011: second
2012: third
2013: group stage
2015: fourth
2016: group stage
2017: group stage
2018: group stage
2019: group stage
2022: group stage

References

Asian national under-17 association football teams
U17